Du Barry, Woman of Passion is a 1930 American pre-Code dramatic film starring Norma Talmadge, produced by her husband Joseph Schenck, released through United Artists, and based on a 1901 stage play Du Barry written and produced by David Belasco and starring Mrs. Leslie Carter.

This film is the second talking picture of silent star Talmadge and also her last motion picture.  Prints of this film survive in the Library of Congress.

Cast
Norma Talmadge - Madame Du Barry
William Farnum - Louis XV
Conrad Nagel - Cosse de Brissac
Hobart Bosworth - Duc de Brissac
Ullrich Haupt - Jean Du Barry
Alison Skipworth - La Gourdan
E. Allyn Warren - Denys
Edgar Norton - Renal
Edwin Maxwell - Maupeou
Henry Kolker - D'Aiguillon
Oscar Apfel - ?
Eugenie Besserer - Rosalie/Prison Matron
Earle Browne - Stage Director
Knute Erickson - Jailer
Cissy Fitzgerald - Bit role
Clark Gable - Extra
Lucille La Verne - Bit role
Tom Ricketts - King's Aide
Tom Santschi - Bit role
Michael Visaroff - Bit

See also
DuBarry (1915)

References

External links
Du Barry, Woman of Passion at IMDB
 AllMovie entry
European release poster of the movie

1930 films
1930s historical romance films
1930 romantic drama films
American romantic drama films
American black-and-white films
American films based on plays
Films directed by Sam Taylor
Films produced by Joseph M. Schenck
Films set in the 18th century
Films set in Paris
Films with screenplays by Sam Taylor (director)
United Artists films
Remakes of American films
Sound film remakes of silent films
Cultural depictions of Madame du Barry
Works about Louis XV
American historical romance films
1930s English-language films
1930s American films